Qased may refer to:

 Qased Othman (musician), a member of Jordanian rock band JadaL
 Qased (bomb), an Iranian smartbomb, precision-guided munition
 Qased (rocket), an Iranian launch vehicle, small satellite orbital space roket

See also

 Courier
 Qassed (bomb), an Iranian guided bomb, precision smart munition
 Qasid (disambiguation); including
 Ghased (disambiguation); including
 قاصد (disambiguation)